Surrey Lake Summit, (el. ), formerly known as Clapperton Creek Summit, is a highway summit in British Columbia, Canada. It is the highest point on British Columbia Highway 5, and is located between Merritt and Kamloops, near kilometre-post 322.

See also
Coquihalla Pass

References

Mountain passes of British Columbia
Nicola Country